The 1965 Lafayette Leopards baseball team represented Lafayette College in the 1965 NCAA University Division baseball season. The Leopards played their home games at Fisher Field. The team was coached by Charlie Gelbert in his 20th year at Lafayette.

The Leopards won the District II Playoff to advanced to the College World Series, where they were defeated by the Connecticut Huskies.

Roster

Schedule 

! style="" | Regular Season
|- valign="top" 

|- align="center" bgcolor="#ccffcc"
| 1 || March 24 || at  || Ernie Shore Stadium • Richmond, Virginia || 3–0 || 1–0 || –
|- align="center" bgcolor="#ffcccc"
| 2 || March 24 || at Richmond || Ernie Shore Stadium • Richmond, Virginia || 0–10 || 1–1 || –
|-

|- align="center" bgcolor="#ccffcc"
| 3 || April 6 ||  || Fisher Field • Easton, Pennsylvania || 2–1 || 2–1 || 1–0
|- align="center" bgcolor="#ccffcc"
| 4 || April 8 || at  || Unknown • Bethlehem, Pennsylvania || 6–3 || 3–1 || 2–0
|- align="center" bgcolor="#ccffcc"
| 5 || April 10 ||  || Fisher Field • Easton, Pennsylvania || 3–2 || 4–1 || 2–0
|- align="center" bgcolor="#ccffcc"
| 6 || April 14 || at  || Erny Field • Philadelphia, Pennsylvania || 9–5 || 5–1 || 2–0
|- align="center" bgcolor="#ffcccc"
| 7 || April 17 || at  || Bainton Field • Piscataway, New Jersey || 0–2 || 5–2 || 2–0
|- align="center" bgcolor="#ccffcc"
| 8 || April 19 || at  || New Beaver Field • University Park, Pennsylvania || 9–1 || 6–2 || 2–0
|- align="center" bgcolor="#ccffcc"
| 9 || April 21 ||  || Fisher Field • Easton, Pennsylvania || 5–1 || 7–2 || 2–0
|- align="center" bgcolor="#ffcccc"
| 10 || April 24 ||  || Fisher Field • Easton, Pennsylvania || 6–8 || 7–3 || 2–1
|- align="center" bgcolor="#ccffcc"
| 11 || April 27 ||  || Fisher Field • Easton, Pennsylvania || 9–2 || 8–3 || 3–1
|- align="center" bgcolor="#ccffcc"
| 12 || April 28 ||  || Fisher Field • Easton, Pennsylvania || 7–2 || 9–3 || 4–1
|-

|- align="center" bgcolor="#ccffcc"
| 13 || May 1 || at Gettysburg || Unknown • Gettysburg, Pennsylvania || 7–4 || 10–3 || 5–1
|- align="center" bgcolor="#ccffcc"
| 14 || May 3 || at  || Unknown • Reading, Pennsylvania || 4–1 || 11–3 || 5–1
|- align="center" bgcolor="#ccffcc"
| 15 || May 5 || Rutgers || Fisher Field • Easton, Pennsylvania || 8–2 || 12–3 || 5–1
|- align="center" bgcolor="#ffcccc"
| 16 || May 8 || at  || Unknown • Bethlehem, Pennsylvania || 1–8 || 12–4 || 5–2
|- align="center" bgcolor="#ccffcc"
| 17 || May 10 || at  || Unknown • Lewisburg, Pennsylvania || 6–4 || 13–4 || 6–2
|- align="center" bgcolor="#ccffcc"
| 18 || May 12 || at  || Unknown • Philadelphia, Pennsylvania || 9–2 || 14–4 || 6–2
|- align="center" bgcolor="#ccffcc"
| 19 || May 15 || Lehigh || Fisher Field • Easton, Pennsylvania || 8–7 || 15–4 || 7–2
|-

|-
|-
! style="" | Postseason
|- valign="top"

|- align="center" bgcolor="#ccffcc"
| 20 || May 28 || vs  || Bill Clarke Field • Princeton, New Jersey || 4–3 || 16–4 || 7–2
|- align="center" bgcolor="#ccffcc"
| 21 || May 29 || at  || Bill Clarke Field • Princeton, New Jersey || 5–4 || 17–4 || 7–2
|-

|- align="center" bgcolor="#ccffcc"
| 22 || May 29 || at Princeton || Bill Clarke Field • Princeton, New Jersey || 5–4 || 18–4 || 7–2
|- align="center" bgcolor="#ffcccc"
| 23 || June 1 ||  || Fisher Field • Easton, Pennsylvania || 4–8 || 18–5 || 7–2
|- align="center" bgcolor="#ccffcc"
| 24 || June 5 || at Lehigh || Unknown • Bethlehem, Pennsylvania || 15–6 || 19–5 || 7–2
|- align="center" bgcolor="#ccffcc"
| 25 || June 5 || Lehigh || Fisher Field • Easton, Pennsylvania || 4–3 || 20–5 || 7–2
|-

|- align="center" bgcolor="#ffcccc"
| 26 || June 7 || vs Arizona State || Johnny Rosenblatt Stadium • Omaha, Nebraska || 1–14 || 20–6 || 7–2
|- align="center" bgcolor="#ffcccc"
| 27 || June 8 || vs Connecticut || Johnny Rosenblatt Stadium • Omaha, Nebraska || 4–6 || 20–7 || 7–2
|-

|-
|

References 

Lafayette Leopards baseball seasons
Lafayette Leopards baseball
College World Series seasons
Lafayette Leopards
Middle Atlantic Conference baseball champion seasons